Externato Marista de Lisboa is a school opened by the Marist Brothers in Lisbon, Portugal, in 1947. It is coeducational and runs from preschool through secondary.

References  

Marist Brothers schools
Catholic schools in Portugal
Educational institutions established in 1947
1947 establishments in Portugal